Mulayit Wildlife Sanctuary is a protected area in Myanmar's Kayin State, covering . It was gazetted in 1936.
It is located on the western slopes of the Dawna Range and was established with the support of Buddhist monks. 

The white-fronted scops owl, the silver-eared laughingthrush (Trochalopteron melanostigma), the grey-sided thrush (Turdus feae) and the Tenasserim white-bellied rat (Niviventer tenaster) are found in the Mulayit Taung area.

References

External links
Why there is no WWF program in Burma
Myanmar - Status of Biodiversity Conservation

Protected areas of Myanmar
Protected areas established in 1936
Dawna Range